The term defense industrial base (or DIB), also known as the defense industrial and technological base, is used in political science to refer to a government's industrial assets that are of direct or indirect importance for the production of equipment for a country's armed forces. It is loosely associated with realism, which views the state as the preponderant guarantor of security, and frequently features as an element of grand strategy and defense policy, as well as diplomacy.

United States 
A commonly cited example of a defense industrial base is that of the United States, where, given the onset of the Cold War accompanied by the outbreak of the Korean War, the maintenance "of a peacetime defense industry of significant proportions was an unprecedented event."

Researchers and public figures critical of close ties among legislators, militaries, and the defense industrial base due to a government's monopoly on demand for products of the latter employ the concept of the military–industrial complex to critique these connections. Early studies of interest group representation in the US referred to these ties as exemplary of the iron triangle phenomenon.

Government Coordinating Council 
As of January 27th, 2023, the current governing council of the Defense industrial base in the United States of America includes:

 Office of the Director of National Intelligence
 National Security Council
 U.S. Department of Commerce
 Office of Technology Evaluation, Bureau of Industry and Security
 U.S. Department of Defense
 Director of the Joint Staff
 Office of the Assistant Secretary of Defense and Global Security
 Office of the Assistant Secretary of Defense for Logistics and Material Readiness
 Office of DoD Chief Information Officer
 Office of the Chief, National Guard Bureau
 Office of the Under Secretary of Defense for Acquisition and Sustainment
 Office of the Under Secretary of Defense for Intelligence
 Office of the Under Secretary of Defense for Personnel and Readiness
 U.S. Department of Energy
 U.S. Department of Homeland Security
 Cybersecurity and Infrastructure Security Agency
 U.S. Department of Justice
 Federal Bureau of Investigation
 U.S. Department of State
 Bureau of Political-Military Affairs
 U.S. Department of the Treasury
 Office of Critical Infrastructure Protection & Compliance Policy

Works cited
 Austin, Mike: Managing the US Defense Industrial Base: A Strategic Imperative, Parameters, Summer 1994, pp. 27–37.
 Boezer, Gordon; Gutmaris, Ivans; Muckerman II, Joseph E.: The Defense Technology and Industrial Base: Key Component of National Power, Parameters, Summer 1997, pp. 26–51.
 Abbott, Gerald; Johnson, Stuart: The Changing Defense Industrial Base, Strategic Forum, No. 96, November 1996.
 Gentsch, Eric L.; Peterson, Donna J. S.: A Method for Industrial Base Analysis: An Aerospace Case Study, Bethesda, MD: Logistics Management Institute, 1993
 Markusen, Ann: The Rise of World Weapons, Foreign Policy, No. 114, Spring, 1999, pp. 40–51

References

External links
 A description of the DIB by the Dept of Homeland Security
 DIB programs: Where industry and security intersect, from the Dept. of Commerce

Military–industrial complex